The 1984 Virginia Slims of Chicago was a tennis tournament played on indoor carpet courts at the UIC Pavilion in Chicago, Illinois in the United States that was part of the 1983 Virginia Slims World Championship Series. It was the 13th edition of the tournament and was held from February 6 through February 12, 1984. First-seeded Pam Shriver won the singles title and earned $28,000 first-prize money.

Finals

Singles
 Pam Shriver defeated  Barbara Potter 7–6(7–4), 2–6, 6–3
 It was Shriver's 2nd title of the year and the 50th of her career.

Doubles
 Billie Jean King /  Sharon Walsh defeated  Barbara Potter /  Pam Shriver 5–7, 6–3, 6–3
 It was King's 1st title of the year and the 170th of her career. It was Walsh's 2nd title of the year and the 26th of her career.

Prize money

References

External links
 International Tennis Federation (ITF) tournament edition details
 Tournament draws

Virginia Slims of Chicago
Ameritech Cup
1984 in sports in Illinois
February 1984 sports events in the United States
Virgin